President's Choice Financial, commonly shortened to PC Financial, is the financial service brand of the Canadian supermarket chain Loblaw Companies. 

Two different wholly owned subsidiaries of Loblaw Companies provide services under the President's Choice Financial brand: personal banking and Mastercard credit card services are provided by the federally chartered President's Choice Bank, and insurance is provided by PC Financial Insurance Brokers.

Services 
Bank Machines (ATMs)

Most Loblaws and Loblaws-owned stores offer access to a PC Financial-branded ATM. These ATM can be used for no fee by PC Money Account holders. All other customers who use the ATM (including Simplii) will be charged fees

Mastercard credit cards
President's Choice Financial Mastercard credit cards are issued by President's Choice Bank, a subsidiary of Loblaw Companies. PC Mastercard has no relationship to CIBC, and cash advance fees were reinstated upon the dissolution of the CIBC partnership.l

PC Financial MasterCards are embedded with PayPass technology. In November 2014, Ugo Wallet, a mobile wallet app for Android was launched in partnership with TD Canada Trust. In addition, users can store PC credit cards on Apple Pay and Android Pay.

Insurance
President's Choice offers auto insurance and home insurance, underwritten through a broker model by a number of selected Canadian insurance companies, pet insurance, underwritten by SecuriCan General Insurance Company, and travel insurance by Travel Guard Canada as managing general underwriter and agent for American Home Assurance Company. President's Choice discontinued their home and auto insurance offerings to new customers in 2009 for a brief period as structural changes were made.  During this time, the previous partnership with Aviva came to an end. Their home and auto insurance products returned under a separate "broker model" in January 2010.  Home and auto insurance are offered in Ontario, Alberta, New Brunswick, Prince Edward Island, Nova Scotia, and Newfoundland.

Consumer banking (since 2020)
President's Choice Financial launched the PC Money Account, a new no-fee "debit-like" personal banking service, on September 14, 2020. Unlike its former banking service, which was provided by CIBC, PC Money Accounts are issued directly by President's Choice Bank. The PC Money account card can be used to collect PC Optimum points on everyday purchases, and can be used online and worldwide at any retailer that accepts Mastercard. Unlike conventional chequing accounts in Canada, the PC Money account does not use the Interac network on domestic debit transactions, as the card operates exclusively on MasterCard’s global payment network

Former services

Consumer banking (1996–2017)
Standard consumer banking products (chequing accounts, savings accounts, loans, mortgages) were provided as a joint venture with the Canadian Imperial Bank of Commerce which began in 1996. CIBC offered lines of credit, loans, Registered Retirement Savings Plan (RRSPs), and mortgages using the President's Choice brand under license, except for between January 2001 and October 2005 when banking services were provided by Amicus Bank (a CIBC subsidiary). Services were available in all Canadian provinces, except Quebec. All PC Financial bank accounts had the same bank number as CIBC (010), and were located under one transit/branch number (30800).

Clients performed their banking transactions on the Internet, at a PC- or CIBC-branded ATM, by telephone, or in person at pavilions located inside Loblaw-affiliated stores.

President's Choice Financial consumer banking services were ranked by J.D. Power and Associates as having the highest customer satisfaction among mid-size Canadian banks in 2007, 2008, 2009, 2010, and 2011.

On August 16, 2017 it was announced that Loblaw Companies and CIBC had mutually decided to terminate their joint venture to provide consumer banking products. All PC Financial mortgages, loans, investments, and bank accounts were transferred to CIBC's new direct banking brand Simplii Financial effective November 1, 2017. PC Financial's credit card and insurance products were unaffected by the decision, and continued to be offered by subsidiaries of Loblaw Companies. At the time of the announcement the consumer banking products had approximately 2 million customers.

Ombudsman
As required, President's Choice Bank has an independent Ombudsman to review customer complaints.

Points

Customers collect PC Optimum reward points on purchases made with their President's Choice Financial Mastercard credit cards.

See also
 List of banks in Canada
 President's Choice
 Simplii Financial

References

Footnotes
 BMO closes supermarket locations
 2010 Canadian Retail Banking Customer Satisfaction Study
 PC Financial Online Application
 President's Choice Financial FAQs
 PC MasterCard

External links
 President's Choice Financial

Canadian Imperial Bank of Commerce
Insurance companies of Canada
Supermarket banks
Loblaw Companies
Financial
1996 establishments in Ontario
Companies based in Toronto
Financial services companies established in 1996